Sturgis High School is located in Sturgis, Michigan and is part of the Sturgis Public Schools school district.

Demographics 
The demographic breakdown of the 955 students enrolled in the 2018–19 school year was:

 Male - 50.1%
 Female - 49.9%
 Asian - 1.4%
 Black - 1.8%
 Hispanic - 36.3%
 Native Hawaiian/Pacific Islander - 0.1%
 White - 58.3%
 Multiracial - 2.1%

In addition, 52.1% of students were eligible for reduced-price or free lunch.

Notable people
Tom Bodett (born 1955), American author, voice actor, radio host, and spokesman for Motel 6
Harvey Alfred Miller (1928–2020), American botanist
John Ray (1926–2007), Sturgis High football coach 
Albert M. Todd (1850–1931), United States Representative from Michigan
Asher Wojciechowski (born 1988), professional baseball player

References 

Public high schools in Michigan
Schools in St. Joseph County, Michigan